The Fighter is a 1952 American film noir boxing film based on the 1911 short story "The Mexican" by Jack London. The film is directed by Herbert Kline and produced by Alex Gottlieb. Kline and Aben Kandel wrote the adapted screenplay.

Plot
A boxer, in Mexico, sets out to avenge the murder of his family by using the money from his winnings to purchase weapons.

Cast
 Richard Conte as Felipe Rivera
 Vanessa Brown as Kathy
 Lee J. Cobb as Durango
 Frank Silvera as Paulino
 Roberta Haynes as Nevis
 Hugh Sanders as Roberts
 Claire Carleton as Stella
 Martin Garralaga as Luis
 Argentina Brunetti as Maria
 Rodolfo Hoyos, Jr. as Alvarado
 Margaret Padilla as Elba
 Paul Fierro as Fierro
 Rico Alaniz as Carlos
 Paul Marion as Rivas
 Robert Wells as Tex

See also
The Mexican (1955 film)

Further reading

External links

1952 films
Film noir
American black-and-white films
1952 drama films
Mexican Revolution films
Films based on short fiction
Films based on works by Jack London
American drama films
1950s English-language films
Films directed by Herbert Kline
1950s American films